Conservative movement may refer to: 
Conservatism in the United States, in politics
Conservatism, a political philosophy
Conservative Judaism, a Jewish denomination, unrelated to political ideology